Acantholycosa norvegica is a wolf spider species in the genus Acantholycosa with a Palearctic distribution.

See also 
 List of Lycosidae species

References

External links 

Lycosidae
Spiders described in 1872
Palearctic spiders